Zaher Al Midani (born on 13 April 1989) is a Syrian professional football player who plays for Erbil and the Syrian national team.

International goals

Scores and results list Syria's goal tally first.

Honours

Club

Al-Majd
Damascus International Championship: 2009

Al-Shorta (Syria) 
 Syrian Premier League: 2011–12

Al-Zawraa
 Iraqi Premier League: 2015–16
 Iraqi Super Cup: 2021

Al-Quwa Al-Jawiya
 AFC Cup: 2016, 2017, 2018
 Iraqi Premier League: 2016–17

References

External links
 Profile at Goalzz.com
 Profile at Goal.com

Living people
1989 births
Syrian footballers
Syria international footballers
Association football midfielders
Syrian expatriate footballers
Expatriate footballers in Iraq
Syrian expatriate sportspeople in Iraq
Sportspeople from Damascus
2019 AFC Asian Cup players
AFC Cup winning players
Syrian Premier League players